Black Holes is a 1995 Italian romance film directed by Pappi Corsicato.

Cast 

Iaia Forte as Angela
Vincenzo Peluso as  Adamo
Manuela Arcuri as Adelaide  
Lorenzo Crespi as Adelmo
Tosca D'Aquino as  Donna dei panni
Ninni Bruschetta as Client

References

External links

   
1995 films
Italian romantic drama films
1990s romance films
Films directed by Pappi Corsicato
1990s Italian-language films
1990s Italian films